Christopher J. Chetsanga (born 1935 in Murehwa, Rhodesia) is a prominent Zimbabwean scientist who is a member of the African Academy of Sciences and The World Academy of Sciences. He discovered two enzymes involved in DNA repair. He has also held various academic administrative posts like Vice-Chancellor, Director and Dean.

Biography
Chetsanga was born in Murewa, Zimbabwe on 22 August 1935,  and was baptised in 1948. In his youth, he was educated at Nhowe Mission, and went on to study at University of California, Berkeley where he received his BSc in 1965. Chetsanga also studied for a period at Pepperdine University. In 1969, he received his MSc and PhD in biochemistry and molecular biology from University of Toronto before becoming a post doctoral fellow at Harvard University between 1969 and 1972. Between 1972 and 1983 he became a professor at the University of Michigan, then in 1983 he left to become the senior lecturer in Biochemistry for University of Zimbabwe. In 1990, President Robert Mugabe awarded him President’s Award for Distinguished Contribution to Science and Technology.  Has also awarded the Order of the Star of Zimbabwe. He is presently the vice chancellor at Zimbabwe Ezekiel Guti University.

In 2004, when the Zimbabwe Academy of Sciences was formed, Chetsanga was appointed the first president of the academy. Chetsanga advocated the use of genetically modified food sources as a possible solution for food shortages in Africa in 2020.

Scientific Achievements 
Chetsanga has discovered two enzymes involved in the repair of damaged DNA: firstly, formamidopyrimidine DNA glycosylase, which removes damaged 7-methylguanine from DNA (1979),  and secondly, purine imidazole-ring cyclase, which re-closes imidazole rings of guanine and adenine damaged by x-irradiation (1985).

According to Chetsanga, his research focus in his scientific career has been on DNA and RNA structural and functional details as they relate to cellular metabolism and disease development.

Select publications

References

External links
 Brief Curriculum Vitae, University of Zimbabwe, Department of Biochemistry

v

Zimbabwean scientists
1935 births
Living people
Biochemists
People from Mashonaland East Province
University of California alumni
Pepperdine University alumni
University of California, Berkeley alumni
University of Toronto alumni
University of Michigan faculty
Academic staff of the University of Zimbabwe
Fellows of the African Academy of Sciences